Robert Augustus Smith (1869 - December 4, 1942) was a two-time U.S. National Champion trainer of Thoroughbred racehorses and a U. S. Racing Hall of Fame inductee who won the 1934 Kentucky Derby with Cavalcade and the 1934 Preakness Stakes with High Quest. In addition to his own, Smith trained horses to four National Championships including American Horse of the Year.

References

1869 births
1942 deaths
American horse trainers
American Champion racehorse trainers
United States Thoroughbred Racing Hall of Fame inductees